Tokarevka or Tokaryovka is the name of several inhabited localities in Russia.

Urban localities
Tokaryovka, Tambov Oblast, a work settlement under the administrative jurisdiction of Tokaryovsky Settlement Council, Tokaryovsky District, Tambov Oblast

Rural localities
Tokarevka, Kaliningrad Oblast, a settlement in Chistoprudnensky Rural Okrug of Nesterovsky District of Kaliningrad Oblast
Tokarevka, Novosibirsk Oblast, a village in Karasuksky District of Novosibirsk Oblast
Tokarevka, Penza Oblast, a village in Ulyanovsky Selsoviet of Tamalinsky District of Penza Oblast